Agassi Babatunde Odusina (born 25 July 1992), better known by his stage name Sneakbo, is a British rapper. His first song, "The Wave", peaked at number 48 on the UK Singles Chart and he has since released a number of top 40 hits, such as "Zim Zimma" and "Ring a Ling" between 2012 and 2013.

After releasing music for over eight years, Sneakbo released his debut album Brixton in March 2018.

Early life
At a young age Sneakbo listened to the late rapper Tupac Shakur and pop star Michael Jackson. Sneakbo is of Nigerian descent.

Legal issues

Aggravated assault charges
Sneakbo spent three months incarcerated in Feltham Prison in late 2011 for threatening a woman in violation of an ASBO. Police alleged he was a boss of Brixton's GAS Gang, however this was denied by Sneakbo.

Discography

Studio albums

Mixtapes
 Jetski Wave (2011)
 I'm Buzzin (2011)
 Certified  (2014)
 Jetski Wave 2 (2015)
 9 Lives (2020)
 Jetski Wave 3 (2021)

Singles

As lead artist

As featured artist

References

Black British male rappers
People from Brixton
People from Putney
Rappers from London
English male rappers
Gangsta rappers
1992 births
Living people
English people of Nigerian descent